Sue or SUE may refer to:

Music  
 Sue Records, an American record label
 Sue (album), an album by Frazier Chorus
 "Sue (Or in a Season of Crime)", a song by David Bowie

Places 
 Sue Islet (Queensland), one of the Torres Straits islands, Australia
 Sue, Fukuoka, a town in Japan
 Sue Station (Fukuoka), a railway station
 Sue Lake, a lake in Glacier National Park, Montana, United States

Other uses 
 Suing (to sue), a type of lawsuit
 Sue (name), a feminine given name (and list of people with the name)
 Sué, a god of the Andean Muisca civilization
 Sue (dinosaur), a Tyrannosaurus rex specimen
 Sue Lost in Manhattan or Sue, a 1998 film
 Subsurface Utility Engineering
 Sue ware, ancient Japanese pottery
 ARC (file format) or .sue
 Door County Cherryland Airport's IATA code
 Mary Sue or Sue, an idealized fictional character
 Yoshiko Tanaka or Sue (1956–2011), Japanese actress

People with the surname 
 Carolyn Sue, Australian physician-scientist
 Eugène Sue (1804–1857), French novelist
 Henry Sue, claimant in Sue v Hill, an Australian law case
 Jean-Joseph Sue (1710–1792), French physician and anatomist
 Jean-Joseph Sue (1760–1830), French physician and anatomist
 Sauaso Sue (born 1992), New Zealand-Samoan rugby league player
 Selah Sue (born 1989), Belgian musician and songwriter

See also 
 Sault (disambiguation)
 Sioux, a Native American and First Nations people in North America
 Sioux (disambiguation)
 Soo (disambiguation)
 Su (disambiguation)
 Susan
 , listing many people with forename "Sue"